The Stepkids is the eponymous debut album by American band The Stepkids from Connecticut. It was released on September 27, 2011, through Stones Throw Records. Production was handled by Dan Edinberg, Jeff Gitelman and Tim Walsh.

Mojo placed the album at number 25 on its list of "Top 50 albums of 2011". SPIN also placed the album at number 19 on the list "20 Best R&B albums of 2011".

Music videos were released for "Suburban Dream" directed by Chris King, "Shadows on Behalf" directed by Mac Smullen, "Legend In My Own Mind" directed by Tom Scharpling, and "Wonderfox" directed by Henry DeMaio.

Track listing

Personnel
Dan Edinberg – vocals, bass, double bass (tracks: 6, 7), percussion (track 3), piano (tracks: 4, 9), synthesizer, violin (tracks: 5–9), recording, mixing, producer
Jeff Gitelman – vocals, acoustic guitar (tracks: 1, 7), piano (track 8), synthesizer (track 9), recording, mixing, producer
Tim Walsh – vocals, drums, percussion (tracks: 1–4, 7–10), recording, mixing, producer
Meredith DiMenna – vocals (track 5)
Clara Inés Schuhmacher – vocals (track 7)
Fred DiLeone – clavinet (track 6), Wurlitzer electric piano (track 9)
James Moss – congas (track 8)
Jon Blanck – tenor saxophone (track 6)
Kristian Henson – artwork

References

External links
 The Stepkids – The Stepkids at Bandcamp
 

2011 debut albums
The Stepkids albums
Stones Throw Records albums